Sømosen is a bog straddling the border between Ballerup (95%) and Herlev (5%) municipalities in the northwestern suburbs of Copenhagen, Denmark. It formed some time between 8,000 and 13,000 BC. The water from the bog drains into Harrestrup Å to the south through Sømose Å. It was protected in 1951. The protected area was increased from 20 to 23 hectares in 2006.

Location
Sømosen is located between Frederikssundsvej to the south, Klausdalbrovej to the north, Lautrupparken to the west and Grønsvinget to the east

Description
About one third of the area consists of parkland. The remaining two thirds consists of open water with several small islands and reed forest to the north.

References

External links

Parks in Copenhagen
Protected areas of Ballerup Municipality